Red Tornado is a codename for different characters appearing in American comic books published by DC Comics that appear in the mainstream and other realities. The most common of them is Ma Hunkel and the android version.

Character histories

Ma Hunkel

Created by Sheldon Mayer, she first appeared in her civilian identity as Abigail Mathilda "Ma" Hunkel in All-American Publications' All-American Comics #3 (June 1939), and became the Red Tornado in All-American Comics #20 (Nov. 1940). As the Red Tornado, she was one of the first superhero parodies, as well as one of the first female superheroes (possibly the first), and, when occasionally disguised as a man, comics' first cross-dressing heroine.

Android

Created by writer Gardner Fox and artist Dick Dillin, the sentient android Red Tornado first appeared in Justice League of America #64 (August 1968). The 1968 Red Tornado was a sentient android able to generate tornado-speed winds enabling it to fly and perform other wind-related feats. Originally a member of the Justice Society of America, it moved to another dimension and joined the Justice League of America.

Lois Lane of Earth 2

In 2011 DC rebooted its continuity as part of the New 52. In the series Earth 2, set on the world of that title, Red Tornado's body is said to be under construction in Tokyo and is a gynoid. On Earth 2 Red Tornado appears similar to the pre-reboot version, except for its being a feminine robot inhabited by the consciousness of Superman's wife Lois Lane. Lois's father Sam transfers his daughter's mind into the robot's body, who must contend with her existence as a robot and the reappearance of her now-evil ex-lover. After Red Tornado removes Superman from Darkseid's control, Superman and Lois leave for the Kent family's farm. Later, Lois bands together with Green Lantern (Alan Scott), Batman (Thomas Wayne), Accountable (Jimmy Olsen) and the other gathered heroes to fight against the forces of Apokolips. After a protracted battle with what was thought to be a surviving brainwashed Superman, Lois realizes he is, in fact, a Bizarro, and takes advantage of his deteriorating form to disintegrate him with a cyclone blast.

Other versions

Besides the versions above, the following characters that went by the name Red Tornado are listed below:

 On the genderbent Earth-11, there is an unnamed Red Tornado that is a female.
 Different versions of Red Tornado were featured in the Elseworlds stories:
 In the series Justice, an unnamed Red Tornado is a member of the Justice League.
 In the series Nightwing: The New Order, an unnamed Red Tornado is a member of the Crusaders.
 In the alternative timeline of Flashpoint, the Red Tornadoes are androids created by Doctor Morrow.
 On Earth 10 where World War II was not won by the Allied Forces, there is an unnamed Red Tornado who is a member of the New Reichsmen.
 On Earth 23, there is an unnamed Red Tornado who is a member of its Justice League led by Superman (the superhero identity of President Calvin Ellis).
 On Earth -22 of the Dark Multiverse, there is an unnamed Red Tornado who was a part of its Justice League until he was among those killed by a plot carried out by The Batman Who Laughs.

See also
 Red Torpedo

References

Bibliography

External links
 The Unofficial Red Tornado Biography
 Red Tornado (1940) at Don Markstein's Toonopedia. Archived from the original on January 9, 2017.
 DCcomics.com's Origin on Red Tornado
 DCDP: Red Tornado
 The Unofficial Red Tornado Chronology
 Red Tornado (1968) at Don Markstein's Toonopedia. Archived from the original on January 9, 2017.

Articles about multiple fictional characters
Comics characters introduced in 1939
Characters created by Dick Dillin
Characters created by Gardner Fox
DC Comics code names
Superhero characters code names